Henri Marie Bruno Joseph Léon, Baron Kervyn De Lettenhove (sometimes styled Henry instead) (1856-1928) was a Belgian lawyer and amateur architect and art historian.

Life
He was born in 1856 to Baron Joseph Kervyn de Lettenhove, historian and politician.

Works

Architecture
Castle Tudor, in Sint-Andries, near Bruges, built in 1904-06 for Stanislas van Outryve d’Ydewalle 
Concept for the World War I memorial in the Sint-Lodewijkscollege in Brugge

Books and articles
1907: La toison d'or : notes sur l'institution et l'histoire de l'ordre, depuis l'année 1429 jusqu'à l'année 1559 (edited)
1908: Les chefs-d'oeuvre d'art ancien à l'Exposition de la Toison d'or à Bruges en 1907 (with others)
1912: L'exposition de la miniature (introduction)
1917: La guerre et les oeuvres d'art en Belgique : 1914-1916

Organisations
He presided over multiple exhibitions in Bruges, including:
1902: Exposition des primitifs flamands à Bruges
1908: Bruges - ses peintres

He was also involved with other exhibitions, like the 1907 exhibition of the Golden Fleece in Bruges, a 1910 exhibition in Brussels of 17th century Belgian painting, and a 1912 exhibition on miniature painting.

He was one of the founding members of the "Museum van de Nijverheidskunst" in het Huis de Roode Steen in Bruges, founded in 1908 but only opened to the public in 1911. He was also one of the driving forces behind the Groeningemuseum, but due to the many delays, including the first World War, it only opened after his death.

He was a member of the Royal Commission for Monuments and Sites.

Notes

1856 births
1928 deaths
Jurists from Bruges
Belgian art historians
Architects from Bruges
Barons of Belgium